L-687,384 is a sigma receptor agonist, selective for the σ1 subtype, as well as an NMDA antagonist.

References

Sigma agonists